Michael "Mike" Alwyn Nugent   (born 1945/1946) is an Australian Paralympic athlete and wheelchair manufacturer, who has won six medals at four Paralympics.

Personal
Nugent was paralysed in a motorbike accident and first became involved in wheelchair sport at Princess Alexandra Hospital in Brisbane in 1963 at the age of 17. He began in wheelchair basketball and field events at Kingshome Rehabilitation Centre and became interested in canoeing due to physiotherapist Vernon Hill. He has been married to Paralympic swimmer Pam Foley since 1975. In 1977 he started a Brisbane-based wheelchair-manufacturing business, Surgical Engineering.

Competitive career
Nugent competed at his first National Games in Perth in 1968, and was a regular part of the Queensland team for the games in the 1970s and 1980s. His first international competition was the 1977 FESPIC Games in Sydney. Once his family and business life settled, he began training six days a week to pursue his interest in international competition.

At his first Paralympics, the 1980 Arnhem Games, he won a gold medal in the Men's 200 m 3 event and a silver medal in the Men's 400 m 3 event. His world record-breaking 200 m performance at the 1980 games was recognised as the best international performance by an Australian wheelchair athlete in that year. At the 1984 New York/Stoke Mandeville Games, he won a gold medal and broke a world record in the Men's 400 m 2 event and two bronze medals in the Men's 800 m 2 and Men's 1,500 m 2 events.

At the 1988 Seoul Games, he won a bronze medal in the Men's 200 m 2 event; he had a flat tyre during the early stages of the marathon, but still finished the race to support his teammates. He also participated but did not win any medals in athletics events at the 1992 Barcelona Games.

An avid wheelchair basketballer, he participated in the Australia men's national wheelchair basketball team at the 1986 Gold Cup and was an integral member of the Queensland state wheelchair basketball team. After his retirement from Paralympic competition, he focused on road-racing events to both compete and promote his new wheelchair designs. He has participated in all major international wheelchair road-racing events, including the Beppu-Ōita Marathon, the Sempach Marathon, and the Peachtree Road Race.

References

Paralympic athletes of Australia
Athletes (track and field) at the 1980 Summer Paralympics
Athletes (track and field) at the 1984 Summer Paralympics
Athletes (track and field) at the 1988 Summer Paralympics
Athletes (track and field) at the 1992 Summer Paralympics
Medalists at the 1980 Summer Paralympics
Medalists at the 1984 Summer Paralympics
Medalists at the 1988 Summer Paralympics
Paralympic gold medalists for Australia
Paralympic silver medalists for Australia
Paralympic bronze medalists for Australia
Paralympic medalists in athletics (track and field)
FESPIC Games competitors
Australian male wheelchair racers
Australian men's wheelchair basketball players
People with paraplegia
Athletes from Brisbane
1940s births
Living people